Ruchi may refer to:
 Ruchi, Glarus Alps, a mountain in the Glarus Alps, Switzerland
 Ruchi, Iran, a village in Razavi Khorasan, Iran
 Ruchi (magazine), a Gujarati language magazine.

See also 
 Ruçi, a common last name in Albania
 Ruci, a legendary place associated with Kakusandha Buddha